The harlequin bat (Scotomanes ornatus) is a species of bat in the family Vespertilionidae, the vesper bats. It is the only member of the genus Scotomanes.

The harlequin bat is found in south-eastern Asia from India to China and Vietnam. It is a common and widespread species that lives in forests and caves and roosts in trees.

References

Vesper bats
Mammals of India
Mammals of Nepal
Mammals described in 1851
Taxonomy articles created by Polbot
Taxa named by Edward Blyth
Bats of Asia